(Castilian, Galician, Valencian),  (Portuguese),  (Catalan) is a surname of Spanish and Portuguese origin, respectively.

The surname has become more frequent among Romani people in Spain than among the general Spanish population.

Notable people surnamed Cortes include:

Mononymously known as Cortes
 Hernán Cortés, (1485-1547), Spanish conquistador

Arts and entertainment

Film and television
 Armand Cortes (1880–1948), American actor
 Fernando Cortés (1909–1979), Puerto Rican actor
 Fred Cortes (1921–1964), Filipino actor
 Mapita Cortés (1939–2006), Puerto Rican actress
 Mapy Cortés (1910–1998), Puerto Rican actress
 Irene Cortes (artist) (born 1979), filmmaker and artist

Music
 Aracy Cortes (1904–1985), Brazilian singer
 Carlos Núñez Cortés (born 1942), Argentine musician
 Edmundo Villani-Côrtes (born 1930), Brazilian musical artist
 Garðar Thór Cortes (born 1974), Icelandic tenor
 Getúlio Côrtes (born 1938), Brazilian musical artist
 Lula Côrtes (1949–2011), Brazilian musician
 Pamela Cortes, Ecuadorian singer, actress and dancer
 Ramiro Cortés (1933–1984), American composer
 Santiago Cortés (musician), Latino-Swiss musician and composer
 Sergio Iván Esquivel Cortés (1946–2021), Mexican singer-songwriter
 Rodrigo Cortés (born 1973), Spanish film director, film producer, screenwriter and film editor
 Tony Cortes (born 1968), Cuban American actor and TV host
 Yara Cortes (1921–2002), Brazilian actress

Other arts and entertainment
 Alfonso Cortés (1893–1969), Nicaraguan poet
 Ana Cortés (1895–1998), Chilean painter
 Bernardo Cortés (1934–2017), Spanish writer, humorist, singer and songwriter
 Carmina Useros Cortés (1928–2017), Spanish author
 Édouard Cortès (1882-1969) French Post-Impressionist painter
 Esperanza Cortes (born 1957), American visual artist
 Gustavo Couttolenc Cortés (1921–2015), Mexican writer and academic
 Jesús Carranza Cortés, Mexican potter
 Joaquín Cortés (born 1969), Spanish flamenco dancer
 Liliana Angulo Cortés (born 1974), Colombian visual artist
 Ney Yépez Cortés (born 1968), Ecuadorian writer
 Ricardo Cortés (illustrator) (born 1973), illustrator and author
 Sonya Cortés (born 1962), Puerto Rican entertainer

Politics
 Adriana Fuentes Cortés (born 1968), Mexican politician
 Alberto Baltra Cortés (1912–1981), Chilean politician and economist
 Altineu Côrtes (born 1968), Brazilian politician and businessman
 Bob Cortes (born 1963), politician in the Florida House of Representatives
 David Cortés (politician) (1955–2015), Bolivian politician
 David Bonilla Cortés (born 1974), Puerto Rican politician
 Demetrio Cortes (1921–1993), mayor of Mandaue City, Philippines
 Hilario Sánchez Cortés (born 1957), Mexican politician
 John Cortes (Gibraltarian politician), member of the Gibraltar Socialist Labour Party
 John Cortes (Florida politician) (born 1961), politician in the Florida House of Representatives
 Jonas Cortes (born 1966), Filipino politician
 José Cortés López (1883–1958), Spanish magistrate and politician
 Judith Pallarés i Cortés (born 1972), Andorran politician
 León Cortés Castro (1882–1946), Costa Rica politician
 Luz Virginia Cortés (born 1976), Mexican politician
 Manuel Cortés Quero (1906-1991), Spanish politician
 Mario Mendoza Cortés (1968–2015), Mexican politician
 Pedro Cortés (born 1966), Puerto Rican politician
 Rosalío Cortés (1820–1884), 35th President of Nicaragua
 Santiago Pedro Cortés (born 1954), Mexican politician
 Sara Isabel Castellanos Cortés (born 1946), Mexican politician
 Yulenny Cortés León (born 1976), Mexican politician

Sports

Baseball
 Aurelio Cortés (1904–?), Cuban catcher in the Negro baseball leagues
 Carlos Cortes (born 1997), American baseball player
 Dan Cortes (born 1987), American baseball player
 David Cortés (baseball) (born 1983), Mexican baseball player
 Nestor Cortés Jr. (born 1994), Cuban-American baseball pitcher

Football/soccer
 Adrián Cortés (born 1983), Mexican footballer
 Ascanio Cortés (1914–1998), Chilean footballer
 Brandon Cortés (born 2001), Argentine-Chilean footballer
 Brayan Cortés (born 1995), Chilean footballer
 Bruno Cortês (born 1987), Brazilian footballer
 Bryan Cortés (born 1991), Chilean footballer
 César Cortés (born 1984), Chilean footballer
 David Cortés (Colombian footballer) (born 1992), Colombian footballer
 David Cortés (Spanish footballer) (born 1979), Spanish footballer
 Deyman Cortés (born 2000), Colombian footballer
 Diego Cortés (born 1998), Mexican footballer
 Eduardo Cortes (born 1993), Mexican footballer
 Efraín Cortés (born 1984), Colombian footballer
 Fabián Núñez Cortés (born 1992), Chilean footballer
 Félix Cortés (born 1989), Chilean footballer
 Fernando Cortés (footballer) (born 1988), Mexican footballer
 Fran Cortés (born 1986), Spanish footballer
 Gerardo Cortés (born 1988), a Chilean footballer
 Gilberto Cortés (born 1995), Colombian footballer
 Javier Cortés (born 1989), Mexican footballer
 José Cortés (footballer) (born 1994), Colombian footballer
 Julio César Cortés (born 1941), Uruguayan footballer and coach
 Kevin Manzano Cortés (born 1999), Spanish footballer
 Martín Miguel Cortés (born 1983), Argentine footballer
 Maurício Cortés (born 1997), Colombian footballer
 Nilson Cortes (born 1977), Colombian footballer
 Oriol Cortes (born 1989), Spanish footballer
 Óscar Cortés (footballer, born 1968 or 1970), Colombian footballer
 Rafael García Cortés (born 1958), Spanish footballer
 Ramiro Cortés (footballer) (1931–2016), Chilean footballer
 Ranulfo Cortés (born 1934), Mexican footballer
 Roberto Cortés (Chilean footballer) (1902–1975), Chilean football goalkeeper
 Roberto Carlos Cortés (born 1977), Colombian football defender
 Róger Cortés (born 2000), Costa Rican footballer
 Santiago Cortés (footballer) (1945–2011), El Salvadoran footballer
 Víctor Cortés (born 1976), Colombian footballer
 Walter Cortés (born 2000), Costa Rican footballer

Other sports
 Alejandro Cortés (born 1977), Colombian road cyclist
 Beatriz Gómez Cortés (born 1994), Spanish Olympic swimmer
 Cecelia Cortes (born 1989), professional squash player
 Federico Cortés (born 1937), Argentine cyclist
 Gaston Cortes (born 1985), Argentinian international rugby union player
 Gerardo Cortes Sr. (1928–?), a Chilean modern pentathlete
 Gerardo Cortes Jr. (born 1959), a Chilean modern pentathlete, and son of Gerardo Cortes Sr.
 Jaime Cortés (born 1964), Colombian tennis player
 Jesús Iglesias Cortés (born 1968), Spanish swimmer
 Máximo Cortés (born 1988), Spanish racing driver
 Omar Cortés (born 1977), Spanish gymnast
 Onix Cortés (born 1988), Cuban judoka
 Peter Cortes (born 1947), American rower
 Phil Cortes (born 1982), Canadian racing cyclist
 Ramiro Cortés (basketball) (1931–1977), Uruguayan basketball player
 Ricardo Cortés (born 1980), Mexican boxer
 Sergio Cortés (born 1968), Chilean tennis player

Other people
 Beltrán Cortés (1908–1984), Costa Rican murderer
 Corinna Cortes (born 1961), Danish computer scientist
 Enric Cortès (born 1939), Catalan Capuchin and biblical scholar
 Ernesto Cortes, American community activist
 Irene Cortes (1921–1996), Associate Justice of the Supreme Court of the Philippines
 Jorge Cortés, Spanish academic engineer
 José Cortés de Madariaga (1766-1826), Chilean patriot
 José Muñoz Cortés (1948–1997), Greek clergyman
 Juan Donoso Cortés (1809-1853), Spanish counter-revolutionary, author, and theologian
 Luis G. Cortes, Spanish chess player
 Manuel Cortes (born 1967), British trade unionist
 Margarita Letelier Cortés, Chilean entrepreneur
 Martín Cortés de Albacar (1510–1582), Spanish cosmographer
 Martín Cortés (son of Malinche) (1523–?), son of Hernán Cortés and La Malinche
 Martín Cortés, 2nd Marqués del Valle de Oaxaca (1532–1589), Spanish noble, son of Hernán Cortes
 Oralia Garza de Cortes, librarian, advocate, and bibliographer
 Xavier Cortés Rocha (born 1943), Mexican architect and former rector of the UNAM

See also
 Cortes (disambiguation)
 Cortese (surname)
 Cortez (disambiguation)
 Courtois (disambiguation)

References

Portuguese-language surnames
Spanish-language surnames
Romani surnames